Glendale Town Center, formerly Glendale Shopping Center and known also as Glendale Mall, is a retail shopping center located at 6101 North Keystone Avenue in Indianapolis, Indiana. Its major stores are Target, Lowe's, Landmark Theatres, and a branch of the Indianapolis Public Library.

History
Glendale Shopping Center was planned in 1955 by Howard M. Landau, along with representatives of William H. Block Co. and L. S. Ayres, two Indianapolis-based department stores which would serve as the mall's anchor stores. Each department store was to be positioned at the opposite end of a mall concourse which would contain about 45 stores in total. The site chosen for the mall was along Keystone Avenue at 62nd Street. Representatives of the William H. Block Co. chain said that they felt that the location was suitably positioned for the city's growth at the time, and that having both department stores in the same center would offer a greater shopping variety for customers. Victor Gruen was the mall's architect.

When the  Glendale Shopping Center opened, it was the premier retail center in Indianapolis and boasted an impressive array of upscale retailers. It was converted to a covered mall in the 1960s. Until Glendale's construction, most major department stores in Indianapolis were located only in the Downtown district. Glendale was frequently the first local branch store away from the established flagship locations downtown.

The original mall was demolished March 1, 2007. New construction and design returned it to being an open-air shopping center in early 2008.

The complex is currently owned by Kite Realty.

References

External links

Shopping malls in Indiana
Tourist attractions in Indianapolis
Shopping malls established in 1958
Buildings and structures in Indianapolis
Victor Gruen buildings